The women's 200m individual medley events at the 2019 World Para Swimming Championships were held in the London Aquatics Centre at the Queen Elizabeth Olympic Park in London between 9–15 September.

Medalists

Results

References

2019 World Para Swimming Championships
2019 in women's swimming